is a Japanese computer scientist. He is a professor emeritus at Nara Institute of Science and Technology (NAIST) located in Nara, Japan.

He was one of the computer scientists who invented the FAN algorithm in 1983, which was the fastest ATPG algorithm at that time, and was adopted by industry.

References

Living people
1946 births
Japanese computer scientists
Osaka University alumni
Academic staff of Nara Institute of Science and Technology
Fellow Members of the IEEE
People from Nara Prefecture